The canton of Le Cateau-Cambrésis is an administrative division of the Nord department, northern France. Its borders were modified at the French canton reorganisation which came into effect in March 2015. Its seat is in Le Cateau-Cambrésis.

It consists of the following communes:

Awoingt
Banteux
Bantouzelle
Bazuel
Beaumont-en-Cambrésis
Bertry
Briastre
Busigny
Cantaing-sur-Escaut
Le Cateau-Cambrésis
Catillon-sur-Sambre
Cattenières
Caullery
Clary
Crèvecœur-sur-l'Escaut
Dehéries
Élincourt
Esnes
Flesquières
Fontaine-au-Pire
Gonnelieu
Gouzeaucourt
La Groise
Haucourt-en-Cambrésis
Honnechy
Honnecourt-sur-Escaut
Inchy
Lesdain
Ligny-en-Cambrésis
Malincourt
Marcoing
Maretz
Masnières
Maurois
Mazinghien
Montay
Montigny-en-Cambrésis
Neuvilly
Niergnies
Noyelles-sur-Escaut
Ors
Pommereuil
Rejet-de-Beaulieu
Reumont
Ribécourt-la-Tour
Les Rues-des-Vignes
Rumilly-en-Cambrésis
Saint-Benin
Saint-Souplet
Séranvillers-Forenville
Troisvilles
Villers-Guislain
Villers-Outréaux
Villers-Plouich
Walincourt-Selvigny
Wambaix

References

Cantons of Nord (French department)